Canaseraga Four Corners Historic District is a national historic district located at Canaseraga in Allegany County, New York. It encompasses that part of the remaining commercial core that retains a high degree of architectural integrity. It is an intact example of a cohesive collection of a building type and style that characterized rural villages at the end of the 19th century.

It was listed on the National Register of Historic Places in 2002.

References

Historic districts on the National Register of Historic Places in New York (state)
Historic districts in Allegany County, New York
National Register of Historic Places in Allegany County, New York